Farnborough/Aldershot built-up area and Aldershot Urban Area are names used by the ONS to refer to a conurbation spanning the borders of Surrey, Berkshire and Hampshire in England. The ONS found a population of 252,937 in 2011 (up 4%, rounded, from the 2001 figure of 243,344 residents). This makes it the 29th-largest built-up area in England.

A conurbation consisting of Aldershot and Farnborough, together with Frimley and Camberley was identified as a conurbation since at least the mid 20th century. These four places had a total population of 70,000 in 1931 which grew to 91,700 by 1961.

Most of the conurbation lies alongside the River Blackwater which gives a wider area including Fleet (which is not geographically in the Blackwater Valley) the alternate name of Blackwater Valley.

The area forms part of the London metropolitan area and borders the Metropolitan green belt. It almost adjoins the somewhat lower density Reading/Wokingham Urban Area at Sandhurst.

Subdivisions
It was given these subdivisions in the 2011 census:

References

Urban areas of England
Geography of Hampshire
Geography of Surrey
Geography of Berkshire
Aldershot